The Illinois Festival of Racing, held at Hawthorne Race Course in Stickney/Cicero, Illinois, is a series of six horse races run for and restricted to Illinois (conceived or foaled) state-bred Thoroughbred race horses.  The event usually takes place in November just after the Breeders' Cup series.

The Six Races

References

 Hawthorn Race Course

Horse races in Illinois
Racing series for horses